Syllepte glebalis is a moth in the family Crambidae. It was described by Julius Lederer in 1863. It is found in Cameroon, the Democratic Republic of the Congo (Orientale, North Kivu, Equateur, East Kasai), Ivory Coast, Madagascar, Nigeria, Sierra Leone, Zambia and Zimbabwe.

References

Moths described in 1863
Moths of Africa
glebalis